Afon Wen was a railway station in Afon Wen, Gwynedd, Wales.

The station formed a junction between the Aberystwith and Welsh Coast Railway and the Carnarvonshire Railway and opened to traffic in September 1867.

History 
Trains on the Aberystwyth and Welsh Coast Railway line were operated by the Cambrian Railways, then absorbed into the Great Western Railway. Trains from the Carnarvonshire Railway were operated by the London and North Western Railway and so passed to the London, Midland and Scottish Railway.

The station was host to a GWR camp coach from 1934 to 1939.

The station passed on to the Western Region of British Railways on nationalisation in 1948 (later passing to the London Midland Region in 1963). It was then closed by the British Railways Board on 7 December 1964 (concurrently with the line from Caernavon, both as a result of the Beeching Axe).

In addition to local services Afon Wen was served by trains from both London Paddington and London Euston. Those from Paddington would reach it on Cambrian rails through Machynlleth and Porthmadog, proceeding onward to terminate at Pwllheli.  From Euston the train would travel via Crewe, Bangor and Caernafon: at Afon Wen the front portion of the train would proceed forward to terminate at Porthmadog and the rear carriages would be detached for Pwllheli.

Afon Wen is often quoted as a defining feature of the Great Western Railway in Wales, namely its inheritance of junctions in unlikely and inconvenient locations. Other examples are Moat Lane Junction, Talyllyn Junction, Dovey Junction and Barmouth Junction (renamed Morfa Mawddach in 1960).

The signal box and passing loop initially remained in use after the station closed, but after the lifting of the Caernafon line, these were decommissioned in 1967 and removed three years later (leaving only the old westbound platform line in use as the running line to Pwllheli).  Demolition of the surviving buildings and westbound platform followed by the late 1970s.

The site today 
Trains on the Cambrian Line pass the site of the former station.

The only evidence of the junction that can now be seen from Cambrian Coast trains is the earthworks of the line heading north and the island platform, although the branch side has been filled in.

In popular culture 
 Afon Wen station is known to many through the song Ar y Trên i Afon Wen (On the train to Afon Wen) by the popular Welsh pop group, Sobin a'r Smaeliaid, fronted by Bryn Fôn.

References

Sources

Further material

External links
 The station site on a navigable OS Map, via National Library of Scotland
 Afon Wen station on a 1940s navigable O. S. map
 The station and line, via Rail Map Online
 The line CNV with mileages, via Railway Codes
 The line DJP with mileages, via Railway Codes
 Images of the station, via Yahoo
 The station and line, via LNWR Society
 By DMU from Pwllheli to Amlwch, via Huntley Archives

Disused railway stations in Gwynedd
Railway stations in Great Britain opened in 1867
Railway stations in Great Britain closed in 1964
Former Cambrian Railway stations
Llanystumdwy